SCPM may refer to:

 Dr. William M. Scholl College of Podiatric Medicine
 The ICAO code for Pichilemu Aerodrome
 Stanford Certified Project Manager